Dwarkanath Tagore (Darokanath Ţhakur; 1794–1846) was one of the first Indian industrialists to form an enterprise with British partners. He was the son of Ramlochon Tagore, the founder of the Jorasanko branch of the Tagore family. He was also the grandfather of Rabindranath Tagore.

Childhood
Dwarkanath Tagore was a descendant of Rarhiya Brahmins of the Kushari (Sandilya gotra) division. Their ancestors were called Pirali Brahmin.

On 12 December 1807, Ramlochan died leaving all his property to his adopted son Dwarkanath, who was then a minor. This property consisted of zamindari estates governed by the Regulations of Permanent Settlement introduced by Lord Cornwallis in 1792. The Zamindars were the ruling authority of a certain sub-division or region under the British ruling authority in India and had the authority to collect tax or to rule their fellow residents inside the territory on behalf of the British Government. Therefore, to participate in the Zamindari left by his adopted father Ramlochan Thakur as the forthcoming Zamindar, Dwarkanath left school in 1810 at the age of 16 and apprenticed himself under renowned barrister, Robert Cutlar Fergusson and traveled between Calcutta and his estates at Behrampore and Cuttack.

Business life

Tagore was a western-educated Bengali Brahmin and a civic leader of Kolkata who played a pioneering role in setting up a string of commercial ventures—banking, insurance and shipping companies— in partnership with British traders. In 1828, he became the first Indian bank director. In 1829, he founded Union Bank in Calcutta. He helped found the first Anglo-Indian Managing Agency (industrial organizations that ran jute mills, coal mines, tea plantations, etc.,) Carr, Tagore and Company. (Earlier, Rustomjee Cowasjee, a Parsi in Calcutta, had formed an inter-racial firm but in the early 19th century, Parsis were classified as a Near Eastern community as opposed to South Asian.)

Tagore's company managed large zamindari estates spread across today's West Bengal and Odisha states in India, and in Bangladesh, and held stakes in new enterprises that were tapping the rich coal seams of Bengal, running tug services between Calcutta and the mouth of the river Hooghly and transplanting Chinese tea crop to the plains of Upper Assam.

Carr, Tagore and Company was one of the Indian private companies engaged in the opium trade with China. Production of opium was in India and then sold in China. When the Chinese protested, the East India Company transferred the opium trade to the proxy of certain selected Indian companies, of which this was one. 

In 1832 Tagore purchased the first Indian coal mine in Raniganj, which eventually became the Bengal Coal Company.

Death

Dwarkanath Tagore died "at the peak of his fortune" on the evening of 1 August 1846 at the St. George's Hotel in London.

In his obituary, The London Mail newspaper of 7 August wrote:
"Descended from the highest Brahmin caste of India his family can prove a long and undoubted pedigree. But it is not on account of this nobility that we now review his life but on far better grounds. However gifted, his claims rest on a higher pedestal – he was the benefactor of his country... [T]hey testified to his merits in the encouragement of every public and private undertaking likely to benefit India."

References

Further reading
  Blair B Kling, Partner in Empire: Dwarkanath Tagore and the Age of Enterprise in Eastern India, University of California Press, 1976; Calcutta, 1981. 
 NK Sinha, The Economic History of Bengal 1793–1848, III, Calcutta, 1984.
 Sengupta, Subodh Chandra and Bose, Anjali (editors), 1976/1998, Sansad Bangali Charitabhidhan (Biographical dictionary) Vol I, p223.

External links

 
 

1794 births
1846 deaths
Bengali zamindars
Businesspeople from Kolkata
Burials at Kensal Green Cemetery
Dwarkanath
Indian businesspeople in coal
Bengali Hindus
Indian businesspeople in mining
Indian businesspeople in textiles
Businesspeople in the sugar industry
Indian social workers
Social workers from West Bengal